Love Songs, Werewolves, & Zombies is the sixth studio album by Los Angeles-based pop-punk band The Dollyrots. It was released on Arrested Youth Records, February 25, 2014. Originally a private collection of songs written for fans, the album was initially given away to PledgeMusic supporters and eventually publicly released digitally and on CD.

Track listing

References

The Dollyrots albums
2014 albums